Jequetepeque River is a river located north of the Chicama valley in the La Libertad Region in northern Peru. Its valley has agricultural resources where one of the main products is rice.

In the Jequetepeque valley archeological sites of the Moche culture were found like San Jose de Moro and Pakatnamu.

Localities
Some localities in the valley are:

Chepén
Pacasmayo
Guadalupe
Pacanga

See also
List of rivers of Peru
List of rivers of the Americas by coastline
Trujillo
Valley of Moche
Viru Valley
Chao Valley

References

Rivers of Peru
Rivers of La Libertad Region